Jesu/Eluvium is a split LP between Justin Broadrick's Jesu and Matthew Cooper's Eluvium. It was released through Hydra Head Records on July 5, 2007. The album was recorded at Broadrick's own Avalanche Studio. Broadrick and Cooper wrote, recorded and mixed their respective tracks with John Golden mastering all tracks. Broadrick featured the tracks he had produced later on the Jesu release Why Are We Not Perfect?.

Track listing
Side A
Jesu – "Farewell" (6:26)
Jesu – "Blind & Faithless" (3:31)
Jesu – "Why Are We Not Perfect?" (6:43)
Side B
Eluvium – "Time-Travel of the Sloth Parts I, II, & III" (19:56)

References

2007 EPs
Eluvium (musician) albums
Jesu (band) albums
Split EPs
Hydra Head Records EPs